Karl P. Ameriks (born 1947) is an American philosopher. He is the Emeritus McMahon-Hank Professor of Philosophy at the University of Notre Dame.

Education and career
Ameriks studied at Yale University, A.B., summa cum laude (1969), Ph.D. (1973), where he wrote his thesis under the direction of Karsten Harries.  He joined the faculty at Notre Dame in 1973, and taught there for more than forty years.

He is regarded as one of the foremost scholars of the philosophy of Immanuel Kant and has written widely in the history of late modern and Continental philosophy. Ameriks co-edits the series Cambridge Texts in the History of Philosophy. He was elected a Fellow of the American Academy of Arts and Sciences in 2009.

Bibliography
Kant's Theory of Mind: An Analysis of the Paralogisms of Pure Reason (Oxford: Clarendon Press, 1982; expanded ed., 2000)
Kant and the Fate of Autonomy: Problems in the Appropriation of the Critical Philosophy (Cambridge: Cambridge Univ. Press, 2000)
Interpreting Kant’s Critiques (Oxford: Clarendon Press, 2003)
Kant and the Historical Turn: Philosophy as Critical Interpretation (Oxford: Clarendon Press, 2006)
Kant's Elliptical Path (Oxford: Clarendon Press, 2012)
''Kantian Subjects' ' (Oxford, 2019)

See also
American philosophy
List of American philosophers

References

External links
University of Notre Dame Faculty Bio

1947 births
Philosophers from Indiana
Yale University alumni
University of Notre Dame faculty
Living people
Fellows of the American Academy of Arts and Sciences
Kant scholars
Presidents of the American Philosophical Association